The 1880 United States presidential election in Alabama took place on November 2, 1880, as part of the nationwide presidential election. Alabama voters chose ten representatives, or electors, to the Electoral College, who voted for president and vice president.

Alabama was won by General Winfield Scott Hancock (D–Pennsylvania), running with former Representative William Hayden English, with 59.99% of the popular vote, against Representative James A. Garfield (R-Ohio), running with the 10th chairman of the New York State Republican Executive Committee, Chester A. Arthur, with 37.10% of the vote.

Results

See also 
 United States presidential elections in Alabama

References 

Alabama
1880
1880 Alabama elections